, better known by her stage name May J., is a Japanese pop and R&B singer who made her major label debut under Sony Music Japan on July 12, 2006, with her first mini-album All My Girls. She was born to an Iranian mother and Japanese father.

Early life
May J. was born as May Hashimoto on June 20, 1988, in Yokohama, Japan. The "J" in her name comes from the Persian name "Jamileh", meaning "beautiful". She knows how to speak four languages, including Persian, Japanese, English and Spanish.

May J.'s Iranian mother refused to acknowledge her Persian roots due to perceived negativity towards Iranians in Japan and May J. grew up forbidden to speak the Persian language. Believing she was American, she discovered her true heritage on a chance overhearing of a conversation between her mother and grandmother. During her formative middle school years she began listening to Iranian singers Googoosh and Afshin and has later said she hopes to debut in Iran.

At the age of 14, May J. was successful at a Sony Music Japan audition and soon signed onto Sony Music. While waiting to make her major label debut, May J. was a dancer for Aaron Carter's Japanese concert and was featured on the track Luyva: Another Episode from Sphere of Influence's album Big Deal, credited simply as May.

A childhood fan of Christina Aguilera and Whitney Houston she then came to admire Canadian rock singer Avril Lavigne, winning a MTV lookalike contest as Avril. She began listening to R&B while studying at the American School in Japan, from which she graduated in 2007 following a period of balancing her studies and her singing career.

Career

2006–2009: Debut and development
Released July 12, 2006, under Neosite Discs, the hip-hop division of Sony's Ki/oon Records, the music of her debut mini-album All My Girls was billed by her label as "Jennifer Lopez/Beyoncé style music which has never before existed in Japan."

To celebrate the 10 year anniversary of Neosite Discs, the single "I Say Yeah!" was released on October 4, 2006, as a collaboration by all 5 of the label's signed artists. The single marked May J.'s first appearance in the Oricon top 10.

May J. performed as the opening act for American R&B singer Cassie alongside Rōma Tanaka at Cassie's concert at Shibuya O-EAST on November 28, 2006. December 20, 2006, saw May J.'s first solo single release when "Here We Go feat. Verbal (M-Flo)" dropped and charted at #70 on the weekly charts.

Her follow-up single, "Dear…" was released on May 30, 2006, and was unlike most of her previous work. Despite the ballad being much more Japanese-friendly than her debut, the single charted at just #90. May J. was then featured on Hip-Hop artist Zeebra's new album World of Music on the track "Shinin' Like a Diamond". In October, it was announced that May J. would be releasing her 3rd single, "Do tha' Do tha'" on November 21, followed shortly by her first full-length studio album, Baby Girl on December 5.

In October 2008, she became the co-host of NHK's English-language weekly music program J-Melo, with Shanti Snyder, going out to 180 countries via NHK World. She became sole host in March 2010 and has remained ever since.

2009–present: Rise to prominence
On March 6, 2009, label Rhythm Zone opened a new official site for May J. confirming that she had left Sony to join the Avex imprint. On the May 23, 2009, her second album Family was announced, featuring the single Garden (featuring DJ Kaori, Diggy-MO', クレンチ＆ブリスタ). The album charted at #4 on the Oricon weekly chart.

Her third full album titled For You was released on February 17, 2010. Her first solo live tour, lasting ten weeks and including 40 shows followed, culminating at Tokyo's Shibuya AX venue on May 23, 2010.

On November 24, 2010, she released a mini-album titled Believin... as a prelude to her fourth full album Colors, released on January 26, 2011.

In 2012, May J. recorded the song "Back to Your Heart" with Canadian singer Daniel Powter.

May J. sang the end roll version of the title song "Let It Go" in Disney's Japanese release of the Frozen animated movie which hit No. 8 on the Japan Hot 100 after the film's Japanese release in March 2014. In 2018, she performed the song live in the finale of the touring ice show Fantasy on Ice in Makuhari and Kanazawa.

May J. has appeared on the variety show Kanjani8 no Shiwake Eight since 2012, as part of a karaoke contest segment, winning 26 straight contests before losing to Sarah Àlainn with the Idina Menzel version of "Let It Go", on the May 3, 2014, edition.

Personal life 
On June 20, 2022, May J. announced that she has married actor Shogen.

Discography

Studio albums

Singles

Extended plays

Best albums

Cover albums

Live albums

Video albums

As featured artist
May 27, 2009 - "Unchain my Heart" by WISE feat. May J. (in album Love Quest)
December 15, 2010 - "HeartBeat" by TARO SOUL & KEN THE 390 feat. May J. (in album So Much Soul)
May 16, 2012 - "REBIRTH-DAY SONG" by Demon Kakka feat. May J. (in album MYTHOLOGY)
October 24, 2012 - "who.am.i.?" by Bentley Jones feat. May J. and Curtis Young (in album UPGRADE 1.0)
March 12, 2013 - "Sweet Spot" by Flo Rida featuring May J.
November 27, 2015 - "北極星" by Show Luo - 羅志祥 feat. May J. - 橋本芽生
April 2017 - Jun.K (from 2PM) - 私たちの別れた話 (Duet with May J.)

References

External links

May J. Official Website - rhythm zone
Sony Music Online Japan / May J.
May J. Official Blog "Janglish Style" - in Japanese
May J. News!! "Live & Information" - May J. Staff Blog
May J. جون (Official Myspace) - MySpace
May J. (MayJamileh) - Twitter
May J. Lyrics Discography

1988 births
Living people
American School in Japan alumni
Avex Group artists
Japanese women pop singers
Japanese people of Iranian descent
Japanese people of Russian descent
Japanese rhythm and blues singers
Ki/oon Music artists
Musicians from Kanagawa Prefecture
People from Yokohama
English-language singers from Japan
Fantasy on Ice guest artists
21st-century Japanese singers
21st-century Japanese women singers